Zaliznyak or Zalizniak is a Ukrainian-language surname. Notable people with the surname include:

Andrey Zaliznyak (1935–2017), Russian linguist
Leonid Zaliznyak, Ukrainian archeologist with specialization in the Mesolithic
Maksym Zalizniak, 18th-century  cossack from Zaporizhzhia

See also
 

Ukrainian-language surnames